Orange Coast is an American lifestyle magazine published for the Orange County, California region. Established in February 1974, Orange Coast is the oldest continuously published lifestyle magazine in the region.  Orange Coast includes coverage of the region'a people, places, cuisine, fashion, home design and décor, and events. The magazine is currently owned by Hour Media Group, LLC.

The magazine was re-imagined in June 2008 and again in August 2017. It is a member of the City and Regional Magazine Association (CRMA).

Previous owners of the publication include Emmis Publishing, which acquired it in July 2007.

References

External links
 

1974 establishments in California
Lifestyle magazines published in the United States
Local interest magazines published in the United States
Monthly magazines published in the United States
Magazines established in 1974
Magazines published in California
Mass media in Orange County, California